The 2016–17 season was Swansea City's 97th season in the English football league system, and their sixth consecutive season in the Premier League. Along with competing in the Premier League, the club competed in the FA Cup and EFL Cup. The season covers the period from 1 July 2016 to 30 June 2017.

Club

Management

Coaching staff

Squad information

First team squad

Ordered by 2016–17 squad numbers.

Transfers

Transfers in

Loans out

Transfers out

New contracts

Pre-season friendlies

Competitions

Overall

Overview

{| class="wikitable" style="text-align: center"
|-
!rowspan=2|Competition
!colspan=8|Record
|-
!
!
!
!
!
!
!
!
|-
| Premier League

|-
| FA Cup

|-
| EFL Cup

|-
! Total

Premier League

League table

Results summary

Results by matchday

Matches

FA Cup

EFL Cup

Statistics

Appearances, goals and cards
Last updated on 21 May 2017

References

Swansea City
Swansea City A.F.C. seasons
Welsh football clubs 2016–17 season